Vasily Gogolev is a Soviet Freestyle wrestler, champion of the USSR and the Europe, winner of the USSR Cup, and winner of the Goodwill Games.

Sport results 
 1981 USSR Freestyle Wrestling championship — 
 1982 USSR Freestyle Wrestling championship — 
 1983 USSR Freestyle Wrestling championship — 
 1984 USSR Freestyle Wrestling championship — 
 1985 USSR Freestyle Wrestling championship — 
 1986 USSR Freestyle Wrestling championship — 
 Commonwealth of Independent States Freestyle Wrestling championship — ;

References

External links 
 
 

Soviet male sport wrestlers
Living people
1957 births
World Wrestling Championships medalists
Goodwill Games medalists in wrestling
European Wrestling Championships medalists
Competitors at the 1986 Goodwill Games